Sikiyaz (Hikäyaź) is a rural locality (a selo) and the administrative centre of Sikiyazsky Selsoviet, Duvansky District, Bashkortostan, Russia. The population was 773 as of 2010. There are 6 streets.

Geography 
Sikiyaz is located 10 km southwest of Mesyagutovo (the district's administrative centre) by road. Ozero is the nearest rural locality.

References 

Rural localities in Duvansky District